

CD single
"Sleeping Child" is Bonnie Pink's fourth single from the album Let Go. The single was released under the East West Japan label on July 12, 2000.

Track listing
"Sleeping Child" (Original)
"Sleeping Child" (Protein Shake Mix)
"Sleeping Child" ("The Gyrations of Virgin Microbes" Mix)
"Sleeping Child" ("Bonnie in Paris" Mix)

12" limited vinyl singles
"Sleeping Child" was also released as two remix vinyls (12" limited) on July 12, 2000.

Remix 1 track listing
a1. "Sleeping Child" (Protein Shake Mix) by Yuka Honda of Cibo Matto
a2. "Sleeping Child" (Original)
b1. "Reason" (Season Dub) by Kaoru Inoue for Chari Chari
b2. "Reason" (Original)

Remix 2 track listing
a1. "Sleeping Child" ("The Gyrations of Virgin Microbes" Mix / Stereolab)
a2. "Sleeping Child" ("The Gyrations of Virgin Microbes" Mix Instrumental / Stereolab)
b1. "Sleeping Child" ("Bonnie in Paris" Mix / The High Llamas)
b2. "Sleeping Child" ("Bonnie in Paris" Mix Instrumental / The High Llamas)

References

2000 singles
2000 songs
Bonnie Pink songs